The 1980–81 Bradford City A.F.C. season was the 68th in the club's history.

The club finished 14th in Division Four, reached the 1st round of the FA Cup, and the 2nd round of the League Cup.

Roy McFarland was appointed as the club's player-manager in May 1981.

Sources

References

Bradford City A.F.C. seasons
Bradford City